This is the list of cathedrals in Chad sorted by denomination.

Roman Catholic 
Cathedrals and pro-cathedrals of the Roman Catholic Church in Chad:
Cathedral of St. Theresa in Doba
Cathedral of St. Mary of the Angels in Goré
Cathedral of St. Ignatius in Mongo
Cathedral of the Sacred Heart in Moundou
Cathedral of Our Lady in Ndjamena
Cathedral of Sts. Peter and Paul in Pala
Cathedral of Our Lady of the Immaculate Conception in Sarh
Pro-cathedral of the Holy Family in Laï

See also
List of cathedrals

References

Churches in Chad
Chad
Cathedrals
Cathedrals